Berat Tosun (born 1 January 1994) is a Turkish footballer of Albanian descent who plays for Afjet Afyonspor. He made his Süper Lig debut on 19 September 2014.

Gençlerbirliği

Berat Tosun has played in the youth squad for Gençlerbirliği and during Süper Lig: 2014–15 Süper Lig he made it to the official team. On 28 September 2014, Gençlerbirliği hosted Balıkesirspor and in the 33rd minute Guido Koçer made a cross from the left side assisting Berat Tosun to make the final knee touch to score the opening goal. In the same game Berat Tosun made his second goal in the 75th minute and this time he received pass from Jean-Jacques Gosso in the penalty box assisting Berat to make an easy finish to put back up Gençlerbirliği 2-1 over Balikesirspor. The game ended 3-1 victory by the home side Gençlerbirliği. On 26 December 2014, Gençlerbirliği hosted Galatasaray, while the away side was up 1-0, Berat Tosun came on to the pitch in the second half and as soon as he came on with the first touch he was able to make a wonderful cross from the right side of the field to Bogdan Stancu to make it 1-1 and game ended in a draw for both sides. On 5 January 2015, Mersin İdman Yurdu hosted the away side Gençlerbirliği and on the 51st minute Hakan Aslantaş rushed down the right side to cross the ball to the penalty box and inside the box Berat ran towards the ball and was able to volley the ball into the net to score the opening goal for Gençlerbirliği. However, this wasn’t enough for the away side for the win as Welliton Soares de Morais scored in the 77th minute to make it a draw.

References

Balıkesirspor, Berat Tosun’u kiraladı, fanatik.com.tr, 14 January 2016

External links
 
 
 
 
 

1994 births
People from Mamak, Ankara
Footballers from Ankara
Living people
Turkish footballers
Turkey youth international footballers
Turkey under-21 international footballers
Association football forwards
Gençlerbirliği S.K. footballers
Hacettepe S.K. footballers
Balıkesirspor footballers
Boluspor footballers
Adana Demirspor footballers
Fethiyespor footballers
Tokatspor footballers
Niğde Anadolu FK footballers
Süper Lig players
TFF First League players
TFF Second League players
TFF Third League players